Bodianus eclancheri, the harlequin wrasse, is a species of wrasse. 
It is found in the Southeast Pacific Ocean.

Size

Etymology
The fish is named in honor of Charles René Augustin L’Eclancher (also spelled Léclancher, 1804–1857), the naval surgeon aboard La Vénus, from which the type specimen was collected.

References

eclancheri
Fish of the Pacific Ocean

Taxa named by Achille Valenciennes
Fish described in 1846